Vandalur Kilambakkam Bus Terminus is under construction in Kilambakkam, Vandalur on GST Road, Chennai to catering the southern Tamil Nadu bus services. It will chiefly handle buses to southern Tamil Nadu, including cities such as Kanniyakumari, Madurai, Thoothukudi, Tiruchirappalli, Tirunelveli, Tiruvannamalai, Sengottai, Thanjavur and Villupuram. It is an integrated bus terminus of mofussil buses of government buses, omni buses, and MTC buses. Once the construction is completed this one will be the Asia's biggest Bus Station.

Timeline
New bus stand project was announced by former Chief Minister J. Jayalalithaa on 30 April 2012. The proposed bus stand would be located in Vandalur zone.

The 88 acres for building the bus terminus lies within protected and prohibited zone of Archaeological Survey of India as it contains "Megalithic Burial Sites." According to an amendment to the Ancient Monuments and Archaeological Sites and Remains Act (AMASR Act) in January 2010, all constructions are banned within 100 metres of ASI-protected areas and any construction or reconstruction or repair of a building with 200 metres of such areas requires permission from NMA.

Chennai Metropolitan Development Authority (CMDA) asked Reach Foundation to undertake the Heritage Impact Assessment for development of the terminus and submit a report. NMA gave its clearance for construction of bus terminus with a total height of 34 metres on five conditions. These include that there should be no development in the 100 metre prohibited area except greenery; boundary of the site and signages should be done by the State government; space for education and interpretation of the site for public; involvement of archaeologist at the time of excavation and mitigation measures to be taken at the time of construction.

The foundation stone was laid on 22 February 2019 by the Tamil Nadu Chief Minister Edappadi K. Palaniswami. The proposed terminus will be built at a cost of  3,940 million. The design and engineering consultant is C.R. Narayana Rao (Consultants) Private Limited for this project.

Facilities
The size of the land earmarked for the project is 88.52 acres. The total built-up area is 640,000 square feet with 215 bus bays, including 130 bays for government buses and 85 bays for omni buses, besides 3.99 acre area of parking spaces for 300 spare buses, 1.99 acre area for 275 cars and 3,582 two wheeler at any given time.

The proposed terminus will have 2,014-square-meter area of public lobby with the following facilities: 
 "Mother's room", medical centre, clinic, two store room, cloak room and an ATM
 A gents dormitory to accommodate 100 males and Ladies Dormitory to accommodate 40 females; 4 nos of driver dormitory to accommodate for 340's drivers
 Four toilet blocks on the ground floor, a security/CCTV room, six electrical room and control room
 20 ticket counters, 3 transport offices and 3 time offices
 2 restaurants over 405 square meters, 40 retail stores across an area of 1,402 square meters 
 Fire service station over 0.54 acre/Electrical sub station across 0.98 acre/sewage treatment plant across 0.96 acre

Bus Bays
The terminus has 14 platforms in 8 bus fingers.
Mofussil bus bays have been designed in a space of 14 acres to accommodate 130 government buses and 85 omni buses, offering connectivity to cities and towns in the southern parts of Tamilnadu.

An MTC bus terminus has also been planned in a space measuring 7.4 acres adjacent to GST Road, with a platform 1,100 metres long and four metres wide, covered with roofing eight metres wide.

A space of two acres has also been earmarked for a bus depot with a workshop.

Metro
An extension of the Chennai Metro Blue Line and Purple Line to the bus terminus has been announced, with a feasibility study completed and land surveys in progress.

See also
 Chennai Mofussil Bus Terminus metro station
 Chennai Contract Carriage Bus Terminus
 Madhavaram Inter-city Bus Terminus
 Chennai Central
 Transport in Chennai

References

Bus stations in Chennai